Sugar (Hangul:슈가, Japanese:シュガー) was a South Korean girl group formed by Starworld in 2001. The group's final lineup was composed of Ahyoomee, Hye Seung and Lee Ha Rin.

During their career, the group saw moderate success in the Korean music market and released multiple songs in Japan. Sugar's Japanese singles "Take It Shake It" and "Real Identity" were notably the theme songs for Kaleido Star, a popular anime.

The group officially disbanded after their contract with Starworld expired in December 2006, while only Ahyoomee maintained her career with Starworld until 2007 before transferring to the Starworld's affiliated label SM Entertainment.

History
Sugar made their first public appearance on music show in December 2001 with pre-debut single "Sweet Love". The group later released their debut album, Tell Me Why, with the single "Tell Me Why" on March 13, 2002. Sugar was most compared by fans to the female groups M.I.L.K. and Shinvi for their similar musical styles and images. Many girl groups during this time only released a debut album before leaving the music market. However, Sugar returned in 2003 with the release of their second album, Shine on June 18. Member Sae Byul changed her stage name to Hye Seung (her real name) ahead of their comeback.

Sugar debut in Japan with release their first album titled Double Rainbow, with the first single "Go the Distance" on February 4, 2004. They released the single 〈All my loving / Cherry Blossom Train (Sakura 列車)〉and〈Wind and Flowers (Wind and Flowers) / Present / Heart & Soul〉Subsequently, in March and July, were used as the soundtrack of the anime Kaleido Star. The singles and album all charted and were met with moderate success. 
Sugar release their 2.5 Korean album titled Secret on October 6, 2004. After the release, member Jung Eum decided to leave the group and pursue a solo career in December 2004. Following  Jung Eum's departure, new member Lee Harin were added to the group for replace her positions in January 2005. With the new line-up, Sugar released their fourth Japanese single, a ballad titled "Heartful" on February 16. Six months later, Sugar released their fifth Japanese single titled "Sunflower / LOVEACCELE". It was able to reach #29 on the Oricon and remained on the charts for 7 weeks.

Sugar released their third Korean album, Sweet Lips in September 2005. In the same years, they released their second Japanese album, COLORS 4 WISHES on November 2. Member Soo Jin then announced that leaving Sugar to pursue an acting career in May 2006. Following her departure, Sugar released a DVD entitled "7 STARS", which contained all of their Japanese music videos. In July 2006, member Ahyoomee began her career as solo singer but remained with the group. Sugar remained their hiatus and reported that would addition new member to replace Soo Jin.

On December 20, 2006, their contract with Starworld expired and announced through KBS World Radio that the group had disbanded. It was stated that each of the current members wanted to embark on solo careers and the company decided not to renew their contract with the members. Ahyoomee continued under Starworld to pursue a solo career before transferring to Starworld affiliated label SM Entertainment. Hye Seung planned to become an actress, while Harin aimed to begin a music career in Japan.

Members
 Ahyoomee (December 2001-December 2006)
 Hye Seung (December 2001-December 2006)
 Lee Ha-rin (January 2005-December 2006)
 Park Soo-jin (December 2001-May 2006)
 Hwang Jung-eum (December 2001-December 2004)

Discography

Studio albums

Single albums

Singles 

Japanese
"Go The Distance" (2004)
"All My Loving/サクラ列車" (2004)
"風と花束/Present/Heart & Soul" (2004)
"Heartful" (2005)
"ひまわり/Loveaccele" (2005)

Awards

Korean Music Videos

Japanese Music Videos

References

External links

 Sugar in naver people
 Official profile 

South Korean girl groups
Musical groups established in 2002
Musical groups disestablished in 2006
2002 establishments in South Korea
2006 disestablishments in South Korea
MAMA Award winners